Athletics is an Asian Games event since 1951 in New Delhi, India. Among major athletics tournaments of the region, it succeeded the athletics at the Far Eastern Championship Games, which had ceased to be held after 1938.

Editions

Events

Men's events

Women's events

Medal table

List of medalists

See also
International athletics championships and games
List of Asian Games records in athletics

External links
Medallists from previous Asian Games - Athletics

 
Asian Games
Sports at the Asian Games
Asian Games